La Tulevieja (also spelled Tulivieja), is a legendary figure from Costa Rican and Panamanian folklore. She is a ghost who wears a distinctive hat called a tule.

Legend 
 
In the legend, a beautiful girl had a secret relationship with a man from her town, resulting in pregnancy. She drowned the child in a river, and was punished by God transforming her into a hideous creature (in some versions she drowns herself as well). She is a short woman with a thick body, swollen breasts, sometimes leaking milk, and tangled hair. She is often described with bird or bat wings, similar to a harpy, and with inverted legs of a bird of prey. Swarms of ants often follow her, drinking milk that falls to the ground.

La Tulevieja has been syncretized with La Llorona in some places, and in those versions of the legend she seeks out babies to feed her milk to, sometimes stealing them. In some interpretations, she is an avenging spirit, punishing lustful men and irresponsible fathers. The only way to escape her clutches is to recite a certain prayer.

The legend has its roots in Talamancan mythology, in Itsö, a spirit of mountains, wind, and rain (though the name can also be used generically to refer to any demon). Itsö demanded the right to eat the first human beings due to help he gave the god Sibú.

The name Tulevieja comes from the tule hat she wears, and in some versions of the story, the plant is a defense against her. Tule can refer to several plants, including Schoenoplectus acutus, Taxodium mucronatum, and Pontederia.

In the mythology of the Ngäbe-Buglé, she is called Tepesa.

References 

Costa Rican folklore
Female legendary creatures
North American ghosts